Downingtown Country Club is a golf course located just outside Downingtown, Pennsylvania. The course was designed by George Fazio. The course's rating is 72.0 for the black tee.

Scorecard

References

External links 
Official Site

Buildings and structures in Chester County, Pennsylvania
Golf clubs and courses in Pennsylvania
1967 establishments in Pennsylvania
Sports venues completed in 1967